King Abdullah II Special Forces Group, commonly known as the JORSOF are strategic-level special forces of the Royal Jordanian Army under the Jordanian Armed Forces. Founded on April 15, 1963, on the orders of the late King Hussein, its primary roles include reconnaissance, counter-terrorism, search and evacuation, intelligence gathering combat, and the protection of key sites. The Special Forces Group are also charged with carrying out precision strikes against critical enemy targets. The unit is equipped and trained to be able to operate behind enemy lines for long periods without any logistical support, and is considered some of the best in the Middle East.

History

Since its establishment in 1963, the Jordanian special operations forces were meant to be flexible and dynamic, in order to successfully face the ever-changing threats to Jordan national security. Their organizational structure has evolved significantly over the past half-century, as internal and external threats changed.

Jordanian special operations forces evolved from a multi-task company-size parachute unit in the early 1960s to brigade-size in the early 1980s, with more specialized units, including a parachute unit, special forces unit and a small counter-terrorism unit.

With the beginning of this century and the emergence of new threats to national security, Jordan established paramilitary troops—the Gendarmerie. The new military force was, and remains, tasked with countering homeland security threats, thus allowing the Special Operations Forces to focus on homeland defense threats. Therefore, the concept changed accordingly, from special operations to joint special operations.

The previous organization of the Royal Joint Special Operations consisted mainly of three main brigades with all standard support and service units that facilitate operations and training.

 The Special Forces Brigade consists of a special forces group, a counter-terrorism battalion, and a combat search-and-rescue battalion. This brigade is mainly equipped and trained to successfully fight unconventional threats, with a good capability to also face conventional ones.
 The Rangers Brigade is more geared towards fighting conventional threats, with good capabilities to support internal security operations.
 The Special Operations Aviation Brigade provides the joint task forces with mobility, timely response capabilities, and insertion platforms, especially for the counter-terrorism teams.

2017 Reform 

In the summer of 2017, the new chairman of the Joint Chiefs of Staff of JAF, Lieutenant General Mahmoud Freihat, launched a package of reforms across JAF—many of which appear to be driven by budgetary constraints. The reforms included specific initiatives that have significantly changed the shape of the Jordanian special operations community.

The first measure deactivated the Joint Special Operations Command headquarters and downgraded the highest-ranking special forces commander from a major general to a colonel-rank officer.

The second measure transformed the 28th Royal Ranger Brigade out of special operations and  re-organized it as the Rapid Intervention / High Readiness Brigade

The third initiative removed the 5th Aviation Brigade from special operations and transferred it to the Jordanian air force. While the brigade's aircraft and pilots now fall under air force control, It has been assigned a direct support role to the King Abdallah ll Special Forces Group.

The result of reforms is to condense a three-brigade Joint Special Operations Command down to a single army-specific group—known as the King Abdullah II Royal Special Operation Forces Group—with most support elements, including administration and logistics, stripped away. At the heart of the new group are the 101st and the 71st battalions, which were converted into Special Unit I—special operations—and Special Unit II—counterterrorism.

The fourth initiative has seen the creation of the Directorate of Special Operations and Rapid Intervention.  This new directorate, which forms part of the general staff of the army, is in charge of the King Abdallah ll Special Operations Group and the Rapid Intervention / High  Readiness Brigade.

The King Abdullah II Special Forces Group is supported by the Mohammed bin Zayed (MbZ) Quick Reaction Force (QRF) Brigade.

There are Similar Units to the Special Operations Units like the Special Gendarmerie's Unit 14 (SWAT unit) & Special Police's Unit 30 (SWAT unit) .
With the need for surrounding countries to develop modern forces, Jordan has become a centre of experience and specialized training for special forces. As an established regional centre for special forces training, Jordan has trained forces from Algeria, Bahrain, Iraq, Kuwait, Lebanon, Libya, Morocco, Oman, Qatar, Saudi Arabia, the UAE and Yemen.

Objectives 

The Jordanian JSOC tasks before the reform in 2017, the reform which will clarify the objectives of the Jordanian special forces and articulate a vision for the role of special forces in future counter-terrorism operations.

Tactical Tasks 
Occupying airborne bridge-head to assist ground forces.
Conducting raids on enemy HQs, artillery sites, missile sites, roads and any other significant key targets.
Airborne and air assault operations.
Armor hunting.
Strategic reconnaissance missions.
Organizing, training and developing guerrilla forces.
Operating behind enemy lines.
Assaulting captive cells and freeing POWs.
Urban area operations.
Readiness to assist any Arab brethren countries upon request.
Search and rescue operation.

Security Tasks 
Counter terrorism operations.
Counter infiltration and smuggling.
Internal security operations.

Training Tasks 
Provide rangers and paratrooper training to JAF units.
Provide officers and NCO's from Arab countries with special operations and ranger courses.
Train public security and customs department officers.
Participate in training courses held in Arab countries.

Strategic Tasks 
Participate in UN missions.
Assist in training friendly forces.
Evacuation operations in time of disasters.

Structure

King Abdullah II Special Forces Group

The King Abdullah II Special Forces Group of the Jordanian Armed Forces serve as Jordan's premiere special forces unit. Founded on April 15, 1963, on the orders of the late King Hussein, its primary roles include direct actions, counter-terrorism, hostage rescue, special reconnaissance, and combat search and rescue.

The Special Forces Group are also charged with carrying out precision strikes against critical enemy targets. The unit is equipped and trained to be able to operate behind enemy lines for long periods without any logistical support. Today, the group consists of four distinct units:
 71st Special Battalion - Counter Terrorism
 101st Special Battalion - Special Operations 
 Group Defense & Protection Battalion 
 Group Training and Development Center.

Mohammed bin Zayed QRF Brigade 

The Quick Reaction Force Brigade was formed on August 1, 2014, its primary roles include direct and indirect action operations inside and outside the Kingdom, border area operations, assist and support King Abdullah II Special Forces Group, internal security Operations, and humanitarian assistance operations.

The brigade is equipped with advanced communication systems, allowing it to develop a fully deployable command and control capability also the brigade has its own Joint Tactical Air Controllers (JTACs) also the brigade is directly supported by RJAF 8th Quick Reaction Squadron (UH-60M). Today, the brigade consists of four Units: 
 61st Quick Reaction Force Battalion (Raiders)
 81st Quick Reaction Force Battalion
 91st Quick Reaction Force Battalion
 Supporting Arms Virtual Trainer (SAVT) Center.

King Abdullah II Special Operations Training Centre

The King Abdullah II Special Operations Training Center (KASOTC) is an installation located in Amman, Jordan that specializes in the latest counter-terrorism, special operations and irregular warfare tactics, techniques and procedures. The base was built by a U.S. construction firm on land donated by the King of Jordan and paid for by the U.S. Defense Department Foreign Military Sales programme, part of the 2005 special appropriation. Management of the construction was undertaken by the United States Army Corps of Engineers.

By 2009, the center had been made operational.  The center is managed by experienced active and retired special forces personnel and qualified training staff.

As a turn-key facility, the center is ideal for pre-deployment training, joint and combined military exercises, or enhancing proficiency of unit requirements. All curricula are scalable to unit size and training needs. Courses begin in the classroom, where trainees master abstract concepts and discuss creative solutions. Trainees then apply their knowledge and skill in a variety of field exercises; simulating real-world conditions including live-fire & maneuver. Performance is observed, measured, and evaluated using state-of-the-art feedback systems.

Prince Hashem School for Special Operations
The Prince Hashem School for Special Operations serves to train and qualify officers and NCOs from JAF.

The school went through the following key phases in terms of organization and development
 in 1963 The first ranger and airborne course was trained by American training team and Ranger and Airborne training wing was established in infantry school.
 In 1970 Ranger and Airborne training wing was established in RSF.
 In 1979 Special forces school was formed and continued to evolve until 1983, where four were formed.
 In 1983 Four training wings (ranger, airborne, specialization and field) were established.
 In 1995 The organization was advanced with a new battalions system and free fall center was added.
 On 1 October 1996 the name has been modified and was called "Joint Special Operations School." 
 On 24/12/2001 special operations school was renamed Prince Hashem bin Al Hussein School for Special Operations.
 In 2017, the school transferred from special forces to Army Training Command.

School Goals and Duties

 The preparation and training of special operations officers on Common functions.
 The preparation and training of joint special operations commissioned officers. 
 The preparation and training of juvenile soldiers basic training and specialist training.
 The preparation and training of members of the armed forces through special training.
 Training of Public security, civil defense, customs and General Intelligence personnel.
 Training members of friendly States on rangers and paratroopers and other special forces works.
 The training of graduates of university officers (field) in addition to the pupils and candidates from Mutah University on rangers and paratroopers.
 Participate in the testing of new weapons and gear mechanisms and sufficiency of Joint special operations duties.
 Conduct annual tests for units and formations Joint special operations and the armed forces.

School Courses

 Platoon Commander's Basic Tactics Course
 English Language Training Course For Officers/NCO
 Ranger Course
 Ranger and Airborne Instruction Course
 Airborne Course
 Air Assault Course
 Fighting In Built Up Areas and Internal Security
 Hand To Hand Fighting (Sejal)
 Marksmanship and Range Management Course
 Special Operations Selection Course (officers and other ranks)
 Section and Group Commanders
 Packing And Parachute Maintenance
 Free Fall Course
 Jump Masters Course
 Pathfinders Course
 Airborne Infiltration Course
 Strategic Reconnaissance Course

SOF Recruiting
Enrollment in the Jordan armed forces is on a voluntary basis, and this is obviously also true for the special operations. The first requirement for those willing to join the special operations is that they should successfully pass physical and mental fitness tests.

From a psychological point of view, applicants are evaluated by a military psychologist in order to assess their personal and leadership traits. Then, applicants undergo a medical screening and an initial PT test. Those who make it through this preliminary selection phase are admitted to an endurance camp (boot camp) for a month of extensive training. The camp is designed to test trainees’ ability to work under physical and mental stress.

Upon completing the camp, recruits take ranger and parachute courses. After this second phase, they are sent to specialized courses to complete their military professional training.

Training Courses

Uniforms 
Special Forces Group and QRF Brigade wear MultiCam, Maroon berets. Some Special Unit II teams wear Full Black Pattern.

References

Special forces
Special Forces
Protective security units
Military units and formations established in 1963
Military units and formations disestablished in 2017
Military units and formations established in 2017